The Borrowdale Fell Race is an annual fell race held in August, starting and finishing in Rosthwaite. It is considered to be one of the "classic" Lakeland races and the route initially heads over Bessyboot before climbing England's highest summit, Scafell Pike. Great Gable is then scaled before a descent to Honister Pass and the final climb up Dale Head. The distance is approximately seventeen miles and the route has around 6,500 feet of ascent.

History
The race, sponsored by Miles Jessop of the Scafell Hotel, Borrowdale, and the New Dungeon Ghyll Hotel, Langdale, was originally intended to link those two establishments. However, Chris Bland, Andy Ewing and others decided on the route via Bessyboot, Esk Hause, Scafell Pike, Great Gable, Honister Hause and Dale Head. The inaugural race was held in 1974 and in that year only, there was an extra checkpoint in Tongue Gill on the descent to Rosthwaite.

In 2001, a foot-and-mouth outbreak led to the cancellation of many fell races. Borrowdale was one of the first to take place as the access restrictions were reduced, and Prince Philip presented the prizes to the leading runners that year.

In 2003, the route to the first checkpoint on Bessyboot was changed following concerns about the possibility of serious injuries due to falling rocks on the steep climb.

The 2007 race was run over a shortened course due to inclement weather. After the climb up Bessyboot and traverse to Esk Hause, runners were directed to Sty Head, missing out Scafell Pike on which conditions were considered to be unsafe. From Sty Head, the usual route was rejoined with the ascent of Great Gable.

A forecast thunderstorm at the time of the 2021 race resulted in a shorter route of around eight miles being used that year. The course went over High Spy and Dale Head, then down to Honister before returning to Rosthwaite.

Borrowdale is one of the Lakeland Classics Trophy races and it has frequently been one of the counting races in the English or British Fell Running Championships.

Results
The men's course record is held by Billy Bland with a time of 2:34:38 set in 1981. The fastest time in the years since then is 2:35:18 by Simon Booth in the 1999 event when the race was featured on the BBC’s Grandstand. The women’s record is 3:14:36 by Menna Angharad in 1997.

Simon Booth has the most wins, with twelve between 1995 and 2010. Billy Bland won ten times between 1976 and 1988. Sarah Haines won the women’s race five times between 1985 and 1990.

A board showing the winners of the race is on permanent display in the Scafell Hotel.

The winners have been as follows.

Note 1: Halstead's time is given as 3:05:57 on the winners’ board but as 3:05:07 in other sources.

Note 2: The 2007 and 2021 races were run over shorter courses.

References

Fell running competitions in Cumbria